Milardović is a Croatian surname. Notable people with the surname include:

Anđelko Milardović (born 1956), Croatian political scientist
Josip Milardović (born 1982), Croatian footballer
Stjepan Milardović (born 1953), former Croatian footballer
Tomislav Milardovic (born 1982), Australian footballer

Croatian surnames
Slavic-language surnames
Patronymic surnames